The Bat Cave mine was a bat guano mine in a natural cave located in the western Grand Canyon of Arizona at river mile 266,  above Lake Mead.

Mining
The cave was apparently discovered in the 1930s by a passing boater. Several unsuccessful early attempts were made to mine the nitrogen-rich guano deposit within the cave for fertilizer. The U.S. Guano Corporation bought the property around 1957. Based on a reputable mining engineer's estimate that the cave contained 100,000 tons of guano, the company constructed an elaborate plan to extract it. A small airstrip was built on a nearby sandbar in the Colorado River, and all supplies and machinery needed were flown in. An aerial tramway was built from the mine to Guano Point on the South Rim, with the cable headhouse built on land leased from the Hualapai Native American tribe. About  of  1.5 inch (38 mm) steel cable were used, to support and pull a cable car large enough to transport  of guano. The same car was used to transport the miners to and from work. The guano was mined using a large industrial "vacuum-cleaner" with  ten-inch hoses. From the cablehead, the guano was hauled by truck to Kingman, Arizona and packaged for retail sale.

During construction of the cableway, which took 14 months, the first of several mishaps occurred. When first tensioning the main cable, a clutch-lever broke, dropping  of cable into the canyon. A new cable was ordered and strung, and mining began. The  pull-cable wore out after a few months use and had to be replaced, bringing the company's total investment up to USD $3,500,000.

The mining engineer's estimate of the potential size of the guano deposit proved wildly optimistic: the cave contained only about 1,000 tons of minable material. Most of the cave was filled with valueless limestone rubble.

In 1959, the cableway was used for the film Edge of Eternity, with the climax of the film involving a fight atop a cable car.

Mining ceased in early 1960. Guano sold for about $100 a ton then, sufficient to generate only a $100,000 gross revenue..

Scientific study
Paleontologist Paul S. Martin and a colleague visited the mine in 1958, after reading a report in  the New York Times that mentioned the guano came from "giant, meat-eating bats millions of years ago." The guano actually came from free-tailed bats, Tadarida brasiliensis, which eat insects. Martin collected a sample from 7 ft (2m) below the surface of the guano, which yielded a radiocarbon date of 12,900 ± 1,500 years ago. The miners reported finding "bat graveyards," some with mummified free-tail bats. No giant meat-eating bats were discovered. Martin had hoped to find fossil pollen, his research interest at that time, but found none in his samples. <ref> Martin, P. S. (2005), Twilight of the Mammoths: Ice Age Extinctions and the Rewilding of America'.'  University of California Press. . </ref>

Post mine activity
A few months after closure of the mine, a US Air Force jet, illegally "hot-dogging" down the canyon, clipped the cable, damaging the plane's wing and severing the cable. The plane survived, and U.S. Guano successfully sued the Air Force for damaging their property, offsetting some of their losses.

In 1975 the abandoned mine became part of Grand Canyon National Park. The National Park Service later proposed removing the tramway remnants within the park, but there was public protest against demolition of these interesting historic relics. As of 2007, some remnants of the old operation remain at Bat Cave, and on the West Rim in the Hualapai Indian Reservation.

Guano Point is still a popular stop for air tours from Las Vegas, Nevada. Tourists can inspect the remnants of the old mining operation. Tour operators pay use-fees to the Hualapai tribe, and the tribe offers a barbecue lunch near the old tramway head house, as part of their Grand Canyon West business venture.

 References 

The primary source of this article is the "Bat Cave" article in Billingsley et al., 1997, Quest for the Pillar of Gold: The Mines and Miners of the Grand Canyon'', Grand Canyon Association, . 

Grand Canyon history
Mines in Arizona
Buildings and structures in Mohave County, Arizona
Hualapai
Aerial tramways in the United States
Colorado River
Caves of Arizona
Underground mines in the United States
Landforms of Mohave County, Arizona
History of Mohave County, Arizona
Tourist attractions in Mohave County, Arizona
1950s establishments in Arizona
1960 disestablishments in Arizona